Anti-Bihari sentiment refers to discrimination against the migrant people of the of Bihar. Bihar had slower economic growth than the rest of India in the 1990s which led to Biharis migrating to other parts of India in search of opportunities. Bihari migrant workers have been subject to a growing degree of hatred by the locals of those states because of their stereotyping as criminals. Moreover, the Biharis have been victimized due to the growing anti-Hindi imposition sentiment in non-Hindi states owing to the Central government agencies excluding regional languages in many national exams and services.

Causes

Since the late 1980s and through to 2005, poor governance and annual flooding of Bihar by the Kosi River (Sorrow of Bihar) contributed to a crisis in the Bihar economy. Corruption in regional politics and kidnappings of professional workers between 1990 and 2005 who spoke against the corruption contributed to an economic collapse and led to the flight of capital, middle class professionals, and business leaders to other parts of India. This flight of business and capital increased unemployment and this led to the mass migration of Bihari farmers and unemployed youth to more developed states of India. The state has a per capita income of $536 a year against India's average of $1470 and 30.6% of the state's population lives below the poverty line against India's average of 22.15%. The level of urbanisation (10.5%) is below the national average (27.78%). Urban poverty in Bihar (32.91%) is above the national average of 23.62%. Bihar has highest population density and lowest GDP in India. Also using per capita water supply as a surrogate variable, Bihar (61 litres per day) is below the national average (142 litres per day).

Impact

Economic

Bihar has a per capita income of $536 a year against India's average of $1,470. Given this income disparity, migrant workers moved to better paid locations and offered to work at lower rates. For example, in Tamil Nadu inter-state migrant construction workers are paid about Rs. 300 to Rs. 400 a day against the minimum of Rs. 750 per day. After thousands of migrant workers left Nashik, industries were worried that their costs would increase through more expensive local workers. In an interview with the Times of India, Raj Thackeray, leader of the MNS said; "The city (Mumbai) cannot take the burden anymore. Look at our roads, our trains and parks. On the pipes that bring water to Mumbai are 40,000 huts. It is a security hazard. The footpaths too have been taken over by migrants. The message has to go to Bihar that there is no space left in Mumbai for you. After destroying the city, the migrants will go back to their villages. But where will we go then?". The strain to Mumbai's infrastructure through migration has also been commented by mainstream secular politicians. The Chief Minister, Vilasrao Deshmukh felt that unchecked migration had placed a strain on the basic infrastructure of the state. However, he has maintained and urged migrant Bihari workers to remain in Maharashtra, even during the height of the anti North Indian agitation. Sheila Dikshit, the Chief Minister of Delhi, said that because of people migrating from Bihar, Delhi's infrastructure was overburdened. She said, that "these people come to Delhi from Bihar but don't ever go back causing burden on Delhi's infrastructure."

Violence

India

Maharashtra

North Indian students, including students from Bihar, preparing for the railway entrance exam were attacked by supporters of Raj Thackeray's far right MNS party in Mumbai on 20 October 2008. One student from Bihar was killed during the attacks. Four people were killed and another seriously injured in the violence that broke out in a village near Kalyan following the arrest of MNS chief Raj Thackeray. Bihar Chief Minister Nitish Kumar demanded action against the Maharashtra Navnirman Sena activists and full security to students. Nitish Kumar requested Maharashtra Chief Minister Vilasrao Deshmukh intervention. Kumar directed the additional director general of police to contact senior police officials in Maharashtra and compile a report on Sunday's incident and asked the home commissioner to hold talks with the Maharashtra home secretary to seek protection for people from Bihar. In 2003, the Shiv Sena alleged that of the 500 Maharashtrian candidates, only ten of them successful in the Railways exams. 90 per cent of the successful candidates were alleged to be from Bihar. Activists from the Shiv Sena ransacked a railway recruitment office in protest against non-Marathi's being among the 650,000 candidates set to compete for 2,200 railway jobs in the state. Eventually, after attacks on Biharis heading towards Mumbai for exams, the central government delayed the exams.
Here it is noteworthy that leaders from Bihar including Lalu Prasad Yadav and Ram Vilas Paswan were the Minister for Railways for a long time. Raj Thackeray alleged that there was a preference for the North Indian candidates by these ministers. He also lauded the next Railway minister Mamata Banerjee for including regional languages in the Railway Recruitment Board exams allowing a level playing field for Marathis and other non-Hindi speakers.

North East states

Biharis have sought work in many states that form part of North East India. There were significant communities in Assam, Nagaland, and Manipur. Biharis who come to work as labourers are frequently and especially targeted in Assam by ULFA militants. There is a fear amongst the local population that Bihari migrants will dominate and annihilate the regional culture and the language. As with all migrations in history, this has created tensions with the local population, which has resulted in large scale violence. In 2000 and 2003, anti-Bihari violence led to the deaths of up to 200 people, and created 10,000 internal refugees. Similar violent incidents have also taken place recently in Manipur and Assam. According to K P S Gill waves of xenophobic violence have swept across Assam repeatedly since 1979, targeting Bangladeshis, Bengalis, Biharis and Marwaris.

Rajasthan
On 13 May 2016, a student named Satyarth was beaten to death and another student was injured in an incident that occurred in Kota, Rajasthan. Regarding the event BJP MLA Bhawani Singh Rajawat of Kota stated that "Students from Bihar are spoiling the atmosphere of city and they must be driven out of the city."

The government in Rajasthan assured full protection to students from Bihar, after ragging incidents of Bihari students in a private engineering college in Udaipur surfaced. Lalu Prasad Yadav and Ram Vilas Paswan flayed the attacks on Bihari students in Rajasthan saying that the students were subjected to insult, torture and assaulted with sticks when they protested. Former chief minister Rabri Devi called upon the chief minister to take necessary action and assure the safety of the students. According to reports, several Bihari students were thrashed during the ragging.

Gujarat

In October 2018, there were incidents of attacks on Hindi-speaking migrants in Gujarat after the alleged rape of a 14-month-old in a village near Himmatnagar in north Gujarat by a Bihari Muslim. The attacks triggered the exodus of the migrants.

Controversial statements

Editorial by Bal Thackeray

Shiv Sena leader, Bal Thackeray, commented in the Shiv Sena newspaper, Samnna on why Biharis are disliked outside eastern states. He quoted part of a text message as the title of his article. The message suggests that Biharis bring diseases, violence, job insecurity, and domination, wherever they go. The text message says, "Ek Bihari, Sau Bimari. Do Bihari Ladai ki taiyari, Teen Bihari train hamari and paanch Bihari to sarkar hamaari" (One Bihari equals hundred diseases, Two Biharis is preparing for fight, Three Biharis it is a train hijack, and five Biharis will try to form the ruling Government). Nitish kumar, the Chief Minister of Bihar, and the Union Railway Minister, Lalu Prasad Yadav, protested against the remark, demanding official condemnation of Bal Thackeray. Kumar, during a press report at Patna Airport, said, "If Manmohan Singh fails to intervene in what is happening in Maharashtra, it would mean only one thing – he is not interested in resolving the issue and that would not be good for the leader of the nation". Angered by Thackeray's insulting remark against the Bihari community, Rashtriya Janata Dal (RJD) activists burned the effigy of the Shiv Sena chief at Kargil Chowk in Patna and said that the senior Thackeray had completely lost his marbles and needed to be immediately committed in a mental asylum.

Consequences

Protests and demonstrations
Angry students in various parts of Bihar disrupted train traffic, as protests continued against assaults on north Indians by MNS activists in Mumbai. Noted Physician Dr Diwakar Tejaswi observed a day-long fast in Patna to protest against repeated violence by the Maharashtra Navnirman Sena (MNS) leader Raj Thackeray and his supporters. Various student organisations gave a call for Bihar shutdown on 25 October 2008 to protest attacks on north Indian candidates by Maharashtra Navnirnam Sena activists during a Railway recruitment examination in Mumbai.

Various cases were filed in Bihar and Jharkhand against Raj Thackeray for assaulting the students. A murder case was also filed by Jagdish Prasad, father of Pawan Kumar, who was allegedly killed by MNS activists in Mumbai. Mumbai police, however, claimed it to be a case of accident. Bihar Chief Minister Nitish Kumar announced a compensation of Rs 1,50,000 to Pawan's family. Bihar state Congress chief, Anil Kumar Sharma, has demanded enactment of an Act by Parliament for closing opportunities to any political party or organisation that indulge in obscurantism and raise such narrow, chauvinistic issues based on regionalism to capture power. A murder case was also lodged against Raj Thackeray and 15 others in a court in Jharkhand on 1 November 2008 following the death of a train passenger last month in Maharashtra. According to the Dhanbad police, their Mumbai counterparts termed Sakaldeo's death as an accident. According to social scientist Dr. Shaibal Gupta, the beating of students from Bihar has consolidated Bihari sub-nationalism.

Rahul Raj

Rahul Raj, from Patna, was shot dead aboard a bus in Mumbai by the police on 27 October 2008. Rahul was 23 years old and was brandishing a pistol and not shooting at public but a major threat to public security. The Mumbai police alleged that he wanted to assassinate Raj Thackeray. Nitish Kumar questioned the police action, but R R Patil justified it, and restored public security. It was alleged that Rahul was protesting against the attacks on Bihari and Uttar Pradeshi candidates appearing for railway examinations. Mumbai crime branch is looking into the incident. During Rahul's funeral slogans of "Raj Thackeray murdabad" and "Rahul Raj amar rahe" were heard. Despite Mumbai police's allegations, there was high level government representation at the funeral. Bihar Deputy CM Sushil Kumar Modi and PHED minister Ashwini Kumar Chaubey represented the state government at the cremation which was also attended by Patna MP Ram Kripal Yadav. The bier was carried by Rahul's friends even as the district administration had arranged a flower-bedecked truck for the purpose.

Attacks against Marathis

After the October 2008 anti-Bihari attacks in Maharashtra, members of the Bharatiya Bhojpuri Sangh (BBS) vandalised the official residence of Tata Motors Jamshedpur plant head S.B. Borwankar, a Maharashtrian. Armed with lathis and hockey sticks, more than 100 BBS members trooped to Borwankar's Nildih Road bungalow around 3.30 pm. Shouting anti-MNS slogans, they smashed windowpanes and broke flowerpots. BBS president Anand Bihari Dubey called the attack on Borwankar's residence unfortunate, and said that he knew BBS members were angry after the attack in Maharashtra on Biharis, but did not expect a reaction. Fear of further violence gripped the 4,000-odd Maharashtrians settlers living in and around the city. Two air-conditioned bogies of the train Vikramshila Express – reportedly with Maharashtrian passengers on board – were set on fire in Barh area of Bihar. Hundreds of slogan-shouting students surrounded Barh railway station in rural Patna demanding that MNS leader Raj Thackeray be tried for sedition. No one was reported injured and passengers fled soon as the attackers started setting the bogies on fire.

In another incident, a senior woman government official in Bihar, with the surname Thackeray, was the target of an angry mob that surrounded her office and shouted slogans against her in Purnia district. Ashwini Dattarey Thackeray was the target of a mob of over 200 people. The mob, led by a local leader of the Lok Janashakti Party, surrounded Thackeray's office in Purnia, about 350 km from here, and shouted slogans like, "Go back Maharashtrians" and "Officer go back, we do not need your services".

A gang of 25 people pelted stones on the Maharashtra Bhawan in Khalasi Line, Kanpur, Uttar Pradesh. Constructed in 1928, the building is owned by the lone trust run by Marathis in Kanpur. It has served as an important venue for prominent festivals, including Ganesh Utsav and Krishna Janmastami. On 29 October, in Ghaziabad, Marathi students at Mahanand Mission Harijan PG College were attacked, allegedly by an Uttar Pradesh student leader and his friends. Police sources in Ghaziabad confirmed the victims stated in their FIR that the attackers "mentioned Rahul Raj and Dharam Dev" while kicking them in their hostel rooms. A group of 20 youths, from Bihar, attacked Maharashtra Sadan in the capital on 3 November. The Rashtrawadi Sena has claimed responsibility for the attack. They ransacked the reception of the building and raised slogans against Raj Thackeray.

Bhojpuri film industry relocation
The Rs 200-crore Bhojpuri film industry is considering moving out of Mumbai owing to threats from MNS workers, and growing insecurity. With an average output of 75 movies per annum and an over 250 million target audience, the Bhojpuri film industry employs hundreds of unskilled and semi-skilled people from the state in various stage of production and distribution. The industry, which has around 50 registered production houses in Mumbai, has initiated talks with Uttar Pradesh and Bihar. "We have given a proposal to the Uttar Pradesh government through its Culture Minister Subhash Pandey for setting up the industry in Lucknow. Besides, we are also counting on some other options like Delhi, Noida and Patna," Bhojpuri superstar and producer Manoj Tiwari said. The films have a large market because the Bhojpuri diaspora is spread over countries like Mauritius, Nepal, Dubai, Guyana, West Indies, Fiji, Indonesia, Suriname and the Netherlands. 70 per cent of the total production cost of a Bhojpuri film — budgets of which range from Rs 80 lakh to Rs 1.25 crore — is usually spent in Maharashtra, providing direct employment to junior artists, make-up men, spot boys and local studios among others.

Improving Bihar

However, the state government, post 2005, has made an effort to improve the economic condition of the state, and reduce the need for migration. In 2008, the state government approved over Rs 70,000 crore worth of investment, has had record tax collection, broken the political-criminal nexus, made improvements in power supply to villages, towns and cities. Bihar, a state fraught with abject poverty, has come out on top as the fastest growing state second year in a row, with a striking 13.1 percent growth in 2011–2012. Its economy has also grown bigger than that of Punjab — the prime destination for Bihari workers. They have laid greater emphasis on education and learning by appointing more teachers, and opening a software park. State Ministers who have failed to live up to election commitments have been dismissed. Bihar's GSDP grew by 18% over the period 2006–2007, which was higher than in the past 10 years and one of the highest recorded by the Government of India for that period.

Other consequences

Since November 2005, there has been a significant fall in the number of migrant workers in many parts of India. After the early 2008 migrant crisis and bombing of the Bhojpuri cinema hall in Punjab, Biharis have decided to stay away from states of the North East and Punjab. Culturally, Biharis appear to have rejected a film based heavily on Punjabi culture. In August 2008, a film called Singh Is Kinng starring Akshay Kumar which was a superhit in India, flopped in Bihar. Bihar has been where Akshay Kumar's films, from Jaanwar to Hey Babyy, have acquired a blockbuster status. In this case, the heavy usage of Punjabi language, culture was said to be the main cause of the movie being rejected by Bihari audiences.

See also
2008 attacks on North Indians in Maharashtra
Anti-India sentiment
Permanent Settlement
Ethnic relations in India
Persecution of Biharis in Bangladesh
Freight equalisation policy

References

Discrimination in India
Muhajir history
Anti-Bihari sentiment
Racism in India